Mabika is an African surname that may refer to:

Dunn Mabika Hove (1959–2007), Zimbabwean military intelligence officer
Mwadi Mabika (born 1976), Congolese-American basketball player
Taylor Mabika, Gabonese boxer
Yolande Mabika (born 1987), Congolese-born Brazilian judoka 

Bantu-language surnames